Aethalopteryx politzari is a moth in the family Cossidae. It is found in Somalia, Tanzania and Kenya.

References

Moths described in 2011
Aethalopteryx